Nicolas Prévost (1604–1670) was a French painter at the court of Louis XIII and Richelieu. In 1640, Richelieu commissioned him to paint the Siege of Privas, based on the engraving by Abraham Bosse, as well as several more of his personal achievements. The painting is now located at the Château de Richelieu. He was a pupil of Simon Vouet.

Notes

1604 births
1670 deaths
17th-century French painters
French male painters